"Hello Beloved" was the fourth and final single from Angela Winbush's solo debut album, Sharp featuring her then-husband Ronald Isley. "Hello Beloved" peaked at number 26 on the U.S. R&B chart.

Charts

Angela Winbush songs
1988 singles
1987 songs
PolyGram singles
Songs written by Angela Winbush